Jean Botham (12 February 1935 – 30 June 2021) was a British swimmer. She competed in two events at the 1952 Summer Olympics.

She also represented England and won a bronze medal in the 440 yards freestyle relay at the 1954 British Empire and Commonwealth Games in Vancouver, Canada. She won the 1953 and 1954 ASA National Championship 110 yards freestyle titles and the 1954 ASA National Championship 220 yards freestyle title.

References

External links
 

1935 births
2021 deaths
British female swimmers
Olympic swimmers of Great Britain
Swimmers at the 1952 Summer Olympics
People from West Ham
Sportspeople from London
Commonwealth Games medallists in swimming
Commonwealth Games bronze medallists for England
Swimmers at the 1954 British Empire and Commonwealth Games
20th-century British women
Medallists at the 1954 British Empire and Commonwealth Games